The Timber Wolf pump-action carbine was designed by Evan Whildin and was produced by Israeli Military Industries, ending in 1989 and is no longer produced. This is one of few modern rifles chambered for revolver cartridges such as the .357 Magnum and the .44 Magnum. Less than 500 were imported to the United States. A single prototype was made in .32-20.

Timber Wolf Specifications

See also
Colt Lightning Carbine (1884-1904), another revolver-cartridge carbine

References

External links
IMI Timber Wolf
User manual

Pump-action rifles
Rifles of Israel
.44 Magnum firearms
Weapons and ammunition introduced in 1989